Statistics of the Scottish Football League in season 1930–31.

Scottish League Division One

Scottish League Division Two

See also
1930–31 in Scottish football

References

 
Scottish Football League seasons